The Curtiss B-8 was an early air-cooled 8-cylinder engine used for a number of aircraft and one motorcycle designed by Glenn Curtiss. It powered the AEA June Bug in 1908, becoming the first Curtiss engine to power a heavier-than-air aircraft in sustained flight.

Applications included:
AEA June Bug
AEA White Wing
AEA Red Wing
Curtiss V-8 motorcycle
Greene 1910 Biplane

Specifications

References

B-8
1900s aircraft piston engines